Rębielice Królewskie  is a village in the administrative district of Gmina Popów, within Kłobuck County, Silesian Voivodeship, in southern Poland.

The village has a population of 848.

Points of interest 
 Rębielice Królewskie Wind Turbine

References

Villages in Kłobuck County